This is a list of singles that have peaked in the top 10 of the Billboard Hot 100 during 1964.

The Beatles scored eleven top ten hits during the year with "I Want to Hold Your Hand", "She Loves You", "Please Please Me", "Twist and Shout", "Can't Buy Me Love", "Do You Want to Know a Secret", "Love Me Do", "P.S. I Love You", "A Hard Day's Night", "I Feel Fine", and "She's a Woman", the most among all other artists.

Top-ten singles

1963 peaks

1965 peaks

See also
 1964 in music
 List of Hot 100 number-one singles of 1964 (U.S.)
 Billboard Year-End Hot 100 singles of 1964

References

General sources

Joel Whitburn Presents the Billboard Hot 100 Charts: The Sixties
Additional information obtained can be verified within Billboard's online archive services and print editions of the magazine.

1964
United States Hot 100 Top 10